Manuel Aparici Navarro (11 December 1902 – 28 August 1964) was a Spanish Roman Catholic priest. He exercised his pastoral mission in his home of Madrid and served as a member of Catholic Action. He focused on the motivation of the faithful in the participation of both the Sacraments and of church life.

He was proclaimed to be Venerable in 2013 on the account of his life of heroic virtue.

Life
Manuel Aparici Navarro was born on 11 December 1902 in Madrid into a life of wealth.

Navarro completed his studies and was ordained to the priesthood in Madrid. He became a member of Catholic Action and he served as the Youth Chairman of the Spanish Catholic Action from 1934 until 1941 during the period of persecutions of the Catholic faith during the onslaught of the Spanish Civil War. He also served as the chaplain for the chapter from 1950 until 1959 and helped to pioneer the Cursillo Movement to help motivate the participation of the faithful in church life.

His health began to decline in 1959 and he died on 28 August 1964.

Beatification process
The beatification process commenced under Pope John Paul II in Madrid on 17 June 1994 which granted him the title Servant of God. The cause saw the accumulation of both documentation and witness testimonies. The process spanned from mid 1994 until 14 October 1998; the process received formal ratification on 15 October 1999 in order for the cause to proceed to the next stage.

The Positio was forwarded to the Congregation for the Causes of Saints in 2000 for further evaluation. On 27 March 2013 he was proclaimed to be Venerable after Pope Francis recognized his life of heroic virtue.

The miracle needed for beatification was investigated in a local tribunal and closed on 13 October 2005.

References

External links
Hagiography Circle
Saints SQPN

1902 births
1964 deaths
20th-century venerated Christians
20th-century Spanish Roman Catholic priests
Venerated Catholics by Pope Francis
Clergy from Madrid
Burials in Madrid